Aristolochia cucurbitifolia is a species of plant in the family Aristolochiaceae. It is endemic to Taiwan.

References

Flora of Taiwan
cucurbitifolia
Vulnerable plants
Taxonomy articles created by Polbot
Taxa named by Bunzō Hayata